Wattsville is an unincorporated community in St. Clair County, Alabama, United States. Wattsville has a post office with ZIP code 35182.

References

Unincorporated communities in St. Clair County, Alabama
Unincorporated communities in Alabama